Lamitta Joseph El Dib (born 2 September 2005) is a Lebanese footballer who plays as a goalkeeper for Lebanese club EFP and the Lebanon national team.

International career
El Dib made her senior international debut for Lebanon on 24 August 2021, as a starter in a 0–0 draw against Tunisia in the 2021 Arab Women's Cup. She was called up to represent Lebanon at the 2022 WAFF Women's Championship, helping her side finish runners-up.

Honours
Lebanon U18
 WAFF U-18 Girls Championship: 2022

Lebanon
 WAFF Women's Championship runner-up: 2022

See also
 List of Lebanon women's international footballers

References

External links
 

2005 births
Living people
People from Akkar Governorate
Lebanese women's footballers
Women's association football goalkeepers
Eleven Football Pro players
Lebanese Women's Football League players
Lebanon women's youth international footballers
Lebanon women's international footballers